Svavar Gestsson (26 June 1944 – 18 January 2021) was an Icelandic politician and Minister for Social Affairs (from February 1980 to May 1983), Minister for Culture and Education in the cabinet of Steingrímur Hermannsson (1988–1991), Member of Parliament (1978–1999), and Ambassador (1999–2009).

Diplomatic career 
From 30 August 2001 to 30 November 2005 he was ambassador in Stockholm and from 21 February 2002 to 5 June 2006 concurrently accredited in Belgrade, Sofia, Tirana and Dhaka
From 22 November 2005 to 15 February 2010 he was ambassador in Copenhagen and from 21 June 2006 to 16 December 2010 Ambassador of Iceland concurrently to Turkey, Israel, Rumenia, Tunis.

References

External links 
 Biography of Svavar Gestsson on the parliament website
Hannes H. Gissurarson: Communism in Iceland, 1918–1998 Social Science Research Institute at the University of Iceland, Reykjavik 2021.

1944 births
2021 deaths
Svavar Gestsson
Svavar Gestsson
Svavar Gestsson
Svavar Gestsson
Svavar Gestsson
Svavar Gestsson
Svavar Gestsson